Central Mindanao University Laboratory High School (CMULHS) is a secondary science laboratory school in Musuan, Maramag, Bukidnon, Philippines. CMULHS is under the management of the Central Mindanao University–College of Education as a separate department and maintains its own set of administrators.

CMULHS has been used as a training ground for the College of Education's students who trains in the school as practicing high school instructors/teachers. Students who wish to enroll in CMULHS must first take and pass the 'University Laboratory High School Admission Test' or ULHSAT. CMULHS rarely accepts transferees.

History
Central Mindanao University Laboratory High School traces its roots from a farm school organized by the Americans. It was established in 1910 as Mailag Agricultural (Industrial) School in Colonia, Mailag, Malaybalay (now part of Valencia City), Bukidnon under Santos Cudal, the head teacher. It offered the first four grades under the elementary agriculture curriculum and produced its first graduates in 1917. By virtue id Executive Order No. 59 dated December 18, 1918, its name was changed to Bukidnon Agricultural School, and it offered the last three grades of the same curriculum with Martin Callao as its principal.

In 1921, the school was transferred to Managok, Malaybalay City and was renamed Bukidnon Rural High School under Proclamation No. 30. The first batch of secondary agriculture students graduated in 1927.

By virtue of Act No. 337, the name was changed to Bukidnon Agricultural High School, with the agriculture curriculum exclusive for male students only. Commonwealth Act No. 313 gave the school a new name — Bukidnon National Agricultural School — under Dr. Felipe Cevallos and Nicodemes Flores as superintendent and principal, respectively. This time, secondary homemaking curriculum was offered to female students with Esmeralda Collado Relis as the first girl to enroll.

In 1943 to 1945, the school was closed due to World War II. After the war the school reopened. Due to the aftermath of the war, it was transferred to Musuan, Maramag, Bukindnon. On June 21, 1952, President Elpidio Quirino signed Republic Act 807 or 'Mindanao Agricultural College Charter' which installed Zosimo Montemayor as president, with its high school department headed by Narciso Pepeito.

On June 19, 1965 by virtue of Republic Act 4498, Mindanao Agricultural College was granted university status and was renamed Central Mindanao University. The high school was then headed by Felixberto Roquia. In 1965 to 1966, the general academic curriculum was introduced. Ireneo Mendoza was the acting head in 1968 to 1969 and Leonardo Chua in 1969 to 1970. In 1970 to 1971, both revised curricula implemented: vocational and general academic curriculum with Leopoldo Roque as principal.

In June 1987, the Vocational Agricultural Secondary Curriculum was phased out and the Science Curriculum was implemented. In 1990 to 1996, the school operated a pure science curriculum. In 1996 to 2008, the science and general secondary curriculum was again implemented, having two sets of honor students. In 2008, the school again operated a pure science curriculum.

In 2012, the school adopted the K–12 education program. The last batch of the old education program (four-year high school education) graduated in 2015.

Curriculum

The current CMULHS curriculum is the former Science Curriculum, for those students who passed the ULHSAT at the top percentile ranks.

Formerly, the curriculum had only two sections per year level. In 2005, the administration phased out the New Secondary Curriculum (NSEC) and replaced the NSEC section with a Science Curriculum section. As of 2008, the Science Curriculum is the only remaining curriculum offered in CMULHS.

The school is using a science-based curriculum, which emphasizes and deals more with Sciences (General Science, Geology, Earth Sciences, Inorganic and Bio Chemistry, Biology, Genetics, Physics, and Environmental Sciences), and Mathematics (Algebra, Consumer Mathematics, Trigonometry, Geometry, Calculus, Computer Sciences, and Statistics).

Clubs and organizations

Clubs
The following are the school clubs in CMULHS:
 Enthuasiastic League of Innovative English Students (ELITES)
 Nagkakaisang Organisasyong Yaring Pilipino (NOYPI)
 Young Mathematician Computer Club (YMC²)
 Young Thinkers Science Club (YTSC)
 Society of Organized and Civilized Youth (SOCY)
 PE Club
 Performing Arts Club (PAC)
 Brilliant Young Technical Erudites (BYTES)
 CMULHS Vectors Varsity

Organizations
The following are the school organizations in CMULHS:
 Central Mindanao University Laboratory High School Supreme Student Council Organization (CMULHSSSCO)
 The Viewer
 The Horizon
 FLUX Movement Media Guild
 Citizenship Advancement Training (CAT)
 University Laboratory High School (ULHS) Band

Notable people

Alumni
 Bonar Laureto and Deorex David Navaja (Class 1999) – competed in Germany in a scientist research contest sponsored by the World Young Researchers on Environment (WYRE) in October 2000 and emerged among the top 23 entries out of 73 entries worldwide. They were also given research internship awards from the Merck Laboratories in the Expo 2000 in Hannover.
 Osmund Nino B. Amoroso, Leo Marconi R. Carrillo, and Ray Ian Chris Y. Oco (Class 2000) – represented the Philippines in the International Science and Engineering Fair held in Detroit, Michigan, United States in 2000 won Fourth Grand Award Honorable Mention Award, sponsored by Eastman Kodak Company in the Intel ISEF Best of Category Award with their entry, "BO307: Histochemical Tests and Antibacterial Effect of Oak-Leaf Fern (Drynaria quercifolia (Linn.) J.Sm) Extracts," among more than 1,000 entries worldwide.
 Minelle Josem "Win-win" Cabinta (Class 2008) – contestant of The Biggest Loser: Pinoy Edition Season 1.
 Efren Leo John Aribal (Class 2008) – represented the Philippines as a youth ambassador to ASEAN-Korea Future Oriented Youth Exchange Program (FOYEP) in Seoul, Korea on January 27-February 2, 2016. Also a member of the Philippine Delegate to The Ship for Southeast Asian and Japanese Youth Program (SSEAYP) 2018.
 Troy Valdehueza (Class 2018) – a Bagong Rizal: Pag-asa ng Bayan 2017 awardee. Also won first place as the official representative of The Philippines in the ASEAN Youth Video Contest 2018 held in Singapore, sponsored by the ASEAN Foundation and US-Mission to ASEAN.

Faculty
 Prof. Andrea G. Azuelo – a Metrobank Foundation, Inc. for the Search of Outstanding Teachers: Secondary Category awardee.

See also
 Central Mindanao University
 Maramag, Bukidnon
 Bukidnon State University
 Philippine Science High School System
 Regional Science High School Union
 Science, Technology, Engineering and Mathematics Education Program

References

High schools in the Philippines
Laboratory schools in the Philippines
University-affiliated schools in the Philippines
Schools in Bukidnon
Educational institutions established in 1965
1965 establishments in the Philippines